Seongjae Yi Si-yeong (Chosŏn'gŭl: 이시영; Hanja: 李始榮, December 3, 1868 – April 19, 1953) was a Korean politician, independence activist, educator and neo-Confucianist scholar. He was the first vice president of South Korea from 1948 to 1951. Yi resigned after the National Defense Corps incident of 1951. His nickname was Seongjae (성재; 省齋) or Sirimsanin (시림산인; 始林山人). Before the Japan–Korea Treaty of 1910, he had served for Joseon as the Governor of South Pyongan Province and the President of Hansung Law Court.

Work book 
 Gamseemanuh (감시만어, 感時漫語)

Popular culture
 Portrayed by Jo Young-jin in the 2010 KBS TV series Freedom Fighter, Lee Hoe-young.

See also 
 Syngman Rhee
 Kim Kyu-sik
 Kim Gu
 Kim Seong-su
 Chang Myon

References

External links 
 Yi Si-yeong 
 Yi Si-yeong:Navercast 
 Yi See-young:Korean historical persons information  
 Yi See-young 
 Yi See-young 
 Yi See-young:Nate  

1868 births
1953 deaths
Vice presidents of South Korea
Korean politicians
Korean independence activists
Korean Confucianists
Korean revolutionaries
South Korean anti-communists
South Korean Confucianists
Korean educators
South Korean people of the Korean War
Recipients of the Order of Merit for National Foundation
People from Seoul
Disease-related deaths in South Korea